Saxeten is a municipality in the Interlaken-Oberhasli administrative district in the canton of Bern in Switzerland.

In 1999 it was the site of an incident where 21 tourists and local canyon guides were killed in a flash flood in Saxetenbach canyon.

History
Saxeten is first mentioned in 1303 as Sachsaton.

During the Middle Ages, the Saxetenbach valley belonged to the Unspunnen Herrschaft.  During the 13th century the Freiherr of Weissenburg inherited a half share of the village from Unspunnen.  In 1334, Weissenburg sold his share to Interlaken Abbey.  The other half share remained with Unspunnen.  In 1348–49, the village joined an unsuccessful rebellion of the Bernese Oberland against the Abbey.  In 1500, the Unspunnen half of the village was acquired by the city of Bern.  In 1528, the city of Bern adopted the new faith of the Protestant Reformation and began imposing it on the Bernese Oberland.  Iseltwald joined many other villages and the Abbey in an unsuccessful rebellion against the new faith.  After Bern imposed its will on the Oberland, they secularized the Abbey and annexed all the Abbey lands, finally combining the two shares of the village.

Saxeten has always been part of the large parish of Gsteig bei Interlaken, now a village in the municipality of Gsteigwiler.

Today the local economy is built on seasonal alpine farming and herding and some tourism.

Saxetenbach Disaster
On 27 July 1999, there was an accident in the Saxetenbach Gorge, just above the village of Saxeten, in which 21 young people from Australia, New Zealand, England, South Africa, and Switzerland died.

48 people from 2 coach tour parties had opted to do a side activity of canyoning where you float, swim and climb through an area, such as a gorge.  It was organized by Adventure World, a now defunct company who were located in Wilderswil, not far from Saxeten.

At 6pm, flash floods began pouring through the gorge and 21 people within the group were swept to their deaths.  18 were tourists and 3 were canyon guides.  By 7pm, the stories had hit the world's news screens, and the hotels people were staying in were bombarded with phone calls, but the staff only saw what was on television.

The survivors were rescued and then questioned by Swiss Polizei before being released and returned to their hotel at 1am the next morning.  Until then they had no idea how many people had died nor the enormity of the disaster.

Identifying the dead bodies was a serious problem for the Swiss authorities, the bodies were badly traumatized.  11 survivors opted to go and identify the dead at the mortuary, but many had to be identified through DNA and dental analysis.

Families were desperate to see for themselves what had happened, and Swissair along with Swiss medical services provided meet & greet sessions for families, and also much counseling for those who had been present.

Bodies of the dead washed up in Lake Brienz, a popular boating lake during peak Summer tourist season.

Since the incident, there has been much rumor released into the press about what happened.  Emergency services claim they sent someone to tell the group of the impending storms, and families of the dead claim that the company should have seen the signs of the weather.  Swiss authorities were quick to blame profit making and general negligence as the cause of the accident.

After the disaster, Adventure World went out of business.  Their former premises, near the Wilderswil Station, are now occupied by a bank.  In 2001, some of the staff at Adventure World were charged in connection to the deaths.  A total of six staff members were found guilty of manslaughter through culpable negligence and given suspended sentences of between two and five months and fined between 4,000 and 7,500 CHF.

Origin of the name
The name Saxeten probably goes back to the Latin form "saxata" (rocky point).

Geography

Of this area,  or 40.6% is used for agricultural purposes, while  or 31.7% is forested.

Of the built up area, housing and buildings made up 0.5% and transportation infrastructure made up 0.8%.  Out of the forested land, 24.6% of the total land area is heavily forested and 4.0% is covered with orchards or small clusters of trees.  Of the agricultural land, 4.4% is pastures and 36.2% is used for alpine pastures.  All the water in the municipality is flowing water.  Of the unproductive areas, 9.2% is unproductive vegetation and 15.6% is too rocky for vegetation.

It is located near the center of the Bödeli watershed.

The Saxetenbach flows through Saxeten, before it joins the Lütschine in Wilderswil.

On 31 December 2009 Amtsbezirk Interlaken, the municipality's former district, was dissolved.  On the following day, 1 January 2010, it joined the newly created Verwaltungskreis Interlaken-Oberhasli.

Coat of arms
The blazon of the municipal coat of arms is Gules on a Pile inverted Argent two Ibex Horns Sable in Saltire.

Demographics
Over the last 10 years (2000-2010) the population has changed at a rate of -24.8%. Migration accounted for -29.3%, while births and deaths accounted for 2.3%. Most of the population speaks German (127 or 99.2%) as their first language with the rest speaking French

, the population was 46.0% male and 54.0% female.  The population was made up of 46 Swiss men and 54 Swiss women. Of the population in the municipality, 64 or about 50.0% were born in Saxeten and lived there in 2000.  There were 46 or 35.9% who were born in the same canton, while 11 or 8.6% were born somewhere else in Switzerland, and 2 or 1.6% were born outside of Switzerland.

, children and teenagers (0–19 years old) make up 17% of the population, while adults (20–64 years old) make up 54% and seniors (over 64 years old) make up 29%.

, there were 57 people who were single and never married in the municipality.  There were 64 married individuals, 6 widows or widowers and 1 individuals who are divorced.

, there were 10 households that consist of only one person and 4 households with five or more people.  , a total of 45 apartments (55.6% of the total) were permanently occupied, while 23 apartments (28.4%) were seasonally occupied and 13 apartments (16.0%) were empty. The vacancy rate for the municipality, was 2.2%.

The historical population is given in the following chart:

Politics
In the 2011 federal election the most popular party was the Swiss People's Party (SVP) which received 52.5% of the vote.  The next three most popular parties were another local party (12.5%), the Conservative Democratic Party (BDP) (9.8%) and the Social Democratic Party (SP) (7.5%).  In the federal election, a total of 40 votes were cast, and the voter turnout was 44.0%.

Economy
, Saxeten had an unemployment rate of 0.85%.  , there were a total of 39 people employed in the municipality.  Of these, there were 22 people employed in the primary economic sector and about 10 businesses involved in this sector.  1 person was employed in the secondary sector and there was 1 business in this sector.  16 people were employed in the tertiary sector, with 4 businesses in this sector. There were 58 residents of the municipality who were employed in some capacity, of which females made up 34.5% of the workforce.

 there were a total of 22 full-time equivalent jobs.  The number of jobs in the primary sector was 13, all of which were in agriculture.  The number of jobs in the secondary sector was 1, all of which were in manufacturing.  The number of jobs in the tertiary sector was 8.  In the tertiary sector; 2 were in the movement and storage of goods, 2 were in a hotel or restaurant and 4 were in education.

, there were 3 workers who commuted into the municipality and 39 workers who commuted away.  The municipality is a net exporter of workers, with about 13.0 workers leaving the municipality for every one entering. Of the working population, 12.1% used public transportation to get to work, and 58.6% used a private car.

Religion
Of the rest of the population, there were 24 individuals (or about 18.75% of the population) who belonged to another Christian church.  2 (or about 1.56% of the population) belonged to no church, are agnostic or atheist, and 6 individuals (or about 4.69% of the population) did not answer the question.

Education
In Saxeten about 34 or (26.6%) of the population have completed non-mandatory upper secondary education, and 3 or (2.3%) have completed additional higher education (either university or a Fachhochschule).  All 3 who completed tertiary schooling were Swiss men.

The Canton of Bern school system provides one year of non-obligatory Kindergarten, followed by six years of Primary school.  This is followed by three years of obligatory lower Secondary school where the students are separated according to ability and aptitude.  Following the lower Secondary students may attend additional schooling or they may enter an apprenticeship.

During the 2010–11 school year, there were a total of 11 students attending classes in Saxeten.  There were no kindergarten classes in the municipality.  A total of 7 students attended a primary school in another municipality.  During the same year, there was one lower secondary class with a total of 4 students.

, there were 14 students in Saxeten who came from another municipality, while 6 residents attended schools outside the municipality.

Transportation
Saxeten is the starting point of a number of routes: the Suls-Lobhorn-Hütte, over the Rengglipass to Aeschiried, and through Wilderswil to the Schynige Platte.

References

External links

  The Saxetenbach accident
  BBC Saxetenbach Disaster

Municipalities of the canton of Bern